The women's 200 metre individual medley event at the 2022 Commonwealth Games was held on 1 August at the Sandwell Aquatics Centre.

Records
Prior to this competition, the existing world, Commonwealth and Games records were as follows:

Schedule
The schedule is as follows:

All times are British Summer Time (UTC+1)

Results

Heats

Final

References

Women's 0200 metre individual medley
Commonwealth Games
Common